Cosipara flexuosa is a moth in the family Crambidae. It was described by Harrison Gray Dyar Jr. in 1918. It is found in Chiapas, Mexico.

The wingspan is about 24 mm. Adults have been recorded on wing in May.

References

Moths described in 1918
Scopariinae